Nisin is a polycyclic antibacterial peptide produced by the bacterium Lactococcus lactis that is used as a food preservative. It has 34 amino acid residues, including the uncommon amino acids lanthionine (Lan), methyllanthionine (MeLan), didehydroalanine (Dha), and didehydroaminobutyric acid (Dhb). These unusual amino acids are introduced by posttranslational modification of the precursor peptide. In these reactions a ribosomally synthesized 57-mer is converted to the final peptide. The unsaturated amino acids originate from serine and threonine, and the enzyme-catalysed addition of cysteine residues to the didehydro amino acids result in the multiple (5) thioether bridges. 

Subtilin and epidermin are related to nisin. All are members of a class of molecules known as lantibiotics.

In the food industry, nisin is obtained from the culturing of L. lactis on natural substrates, such as milk or dextrose, and it is not chemically synthesized.

It was originally isolated in the late 1930s, and produced since the 1950s as Nisaplin from naturally occurring sources by Aplin and Barrett in laboratories in Beaminster in Dorset (now owned by DuPont), and approved as an additive for food use in the US in the late 1960s.

Properties
While in general most bacteriocins inhibit only closely related species, nisin is a rare example of a "broad-spectrum" bacteriocin effective against many Gram-positive organisms, including lactic acid bacteria (commonly associated to avoid food spoilage), Listeria monocytogenes (a known pathogen), Staphylococcus aureus, Bacillus cereus, Clostridium botulinum, etc. It is also particularly effective against spores. Gram-negative bacteria are protected by their outer membrane but may become susceptible to nisin action after a heat shock or when this is coupled with the chelator EDTA. When used in combination with EDTA, nisin has the ability to inhibit E. coli O157:H7 and Salmonella enterica. Nisin, as a class I bacteriocin, is very stable at acidic pHs and is more heat stable at lower pHs. The mode of action of Nisin against pathogens such as L. monocytogenes is to dissipate the membrane potential and pH gradient.

Nisin is soluble in water and can be effective at levels nearing the parts-per-billion range. Nisin concentration can be measured using various techniques such as chromatography or by a simple agar diffusion bioassay.

Applications

Food production 
Nisin is used in processed cheese, meats, beverages, etc. during production to extend shelf life by suppressing Gram-positive spoilage and pathogenic bacteria. In foods, it is common to use nisin at levels ranging from ~1-25 ppm, depending on the food type and regulatory approval.  As a food additive, nisin has an E number of E234.

Other 
Due to its naturally selective spectrum of activity, it is also employed as a selective agent in microbiological media for the isolation of gram-negative bacteria, yeast, and moulds.

Nisin has also been used in food packaging applications and can serve as a preservative by controlled release onto the food surface from the polymer packaging.

In combination with miconazole it has been studied as a possible treatment for infections of Clostridium difficile.

Further reading 

  (Total synthesis)
  (Biosynthesis)
 http://medicalxpress.com/news/2012-10-common-food-tumor-growth.html
 Encyclopedia of Food Microbiology - Page 187 books.google.ae/books?

References

External links 
 Nisin A
 Nisin Z
 Nisin Q
 Nisin F
 Nisin U

Bacteriocins
Lantibiotics
Preservatives
Peripheral membrane proteins
Cyclic peptides
E-number additives